Rangarajapuram is a locality in the Kodambakkam area of Chennai, the capital city of Tamil Nadu, India. Rangarajapuram is primarily a residential area. The pincode for Rangarajapuram is 600024.

Neighbourhoods in Chennai